The 1887 Williams Ephs football team represented the Williams College as an independent during the 1887 college football season. The team compiled a record of 3–3.

Schedule

References

Williams
Williams Ephs football seasons
Williams Ephs football